The 2015 NBA All-Star Game was an exhibition basketball game that was played on February 15, 2015, during the National Basketball Association's (NBA) 2014–15 season. It was the 64th edition of the NBA All-Star Game, and was played at Madison Square Garden in New York City. The Western Conference defeated the Eastern Conference, 163–158. Russell Westbrook was named the All-Star Game Most Valuable Player. The game was televised nationally by TNT and TBS in the United States, and TSN in Canada.

The All-Star Weekend festivities were jointly hosted by the league's two New York City teams, the New York Knicks and the Brooklyn Nets. The NBA awarded the game to New York City in 2013, and the logo for the 2015 All-Star Game was unveiled on July 10, 2014. The All-Star Game itself was played at the Knicks' home arena, Madison Square Garden; the current Garden last hosted the game in 1998, and the Knicks' previous home, the third Madison Square Garden, hosted three earlier All-Star Games. The Saturday All-Star activities were held at the Nets' home arena, the Barclays Center; the Nets previously hosted the 1982 All-Star Game at Brendan Byrne Arena in East Rutherford, New Jersey.

All-Star Game

Coaches

Mike Budenholzer, coach of the Atlanta Hawks, and Steve Kerr, coach of the Golden State Warriors, were selected as the East and West head coach, respectively.

Roster

The rosters for the All-Star Game were chosen in two ways. The starters were chosen via a fan ballot. Two guards and three frontcourt players who received the highest vote were named the All-Star starters. NBA head coaches voted for the reserves for their respective conferences, none of which could be players on their own team. Each coach selected two guards, three frontcourt players and two wild cards, with each selected player ranked in order of preference within each category. If a multi-position player was to be selected, coaches were encouraged to vote for the player at the position that was "most advantageous for the All-Star team", regardless of where the player was listed on the All-Star ballot or the position he was listed in box scores. If a player is unable to participate due to injury, the commissioner will select a replacement.

Stephen Curry of the Golden State Warriors topped the ballots with 1,513,324 votes, which earned him a starting position as a guard in the Western Conference team. Kobe Bryant earned a record 17th consecutive All-Star selection, and Anthony Davis, Marc Gasol, and Blake Griffin completed the Western Conference starting positions. The first-time All-Stars in the West were the Warriors’ Klay Thompson and the Sacramento Kings' DeMarcus Cousins, who was selected as a replacement for the injured Bryant.

The Oklahoma City Thunder were represented by two players: Kevin Durant and Russell Westbrook, both of whom were reserves. Also sending a pair of players to the All-Star Game as reserves were the Portland Trail Blazers, represented by LaMarcus Aldridge and Damian Lillard. The remaining Western Conference reserves were Thompson, Cousins, Tim Duncan, James Harden, Chris Paul, Dirk Nowitzki, Kevin Durant, and Russell Westbrook. Golden State had two All-Star representatives for the first time since 1993, when Tim Hardaway and Chris Mullin were both All-Stars.  It was also the first time the Warriors had a pair of starters since 1967, when Rick Barry and Nate Thurmond were both starters.

The Eastern Conference's leading vote-getter was Cleveland Cavaliers’ LeBron James, who finished with 1,470,483 votes. John Wall, Kyle Lowry, Pau Gasol, and Carmelo Anthony completed the Eastern Conference starting positions. The Eastern Conference team featured four first-time selections: Lowry, Jimmy Butler, Jeff Teague, and Kyle Korver. The Atlanta Hawks were represented by four players: Al Horford, Paul Millsap, Jeff Teague and Kyle Korver, all of whom were reserves. Chris Bosh, Dwyane Wade, and Kyrie Irving completed the remaining Eastern Conference reserves.

The Gasol brothers Marc and Pau were selected as the starting center of the West and the East respectively, marking the first time in NBA history two brothers were picked to start in an All-Star Game. They were also the first brothers to jump center for the opening tip of an All-Star Game. The Gasols were also the first brothers to appear in the same All-Star Game since Tom and Dick Van Arsdale played in the 1970 and 1971 games.

INJ Bryant, Davis, Griffin and Wade were unable to participate due to injury.
REP1 Cousins was named as Bryant's replacement.
REP2 Lillard was named as Griffin's replacement.
REP3 Korver was named as Wade's replacement.
REP4 Nowitzki was named as Davis' replacement.
ST Western Conference head coach Steve Kerr chose Aldridge, Harden and Thompson to start in place of the injured Bryant, Davis and Griffin.

Game
{{basketballbox|bg=#eee|date=February 15, 2015|time=8:30 p.m. ET |place=Madison Square Garden, New York
|referee=
 Derrick Stafford
 Pat Fraher
 Sean Wright
|attendance=17,198
|TV=TNT
|team1=Western Conference |score1=163|team2=Eastern Conference |score2=158
|Q1=47–36 |Q2=36–46 |Q3=39–40 |Q4=41'–36
|points1=Russell Westbrook 41  |points2= LeBron James 30
|rebounds1= Marc Gasol 10 |rebounds2= Pau Gasol 12
|assist1= Chris Paul 15 |assist2= Kyle Lowry 8
|report= Box score
}}

Russell Westbrook scored 41 points and was named the NBA All-Star Game Most Valuable Player. He scored 27 points in 11 minutes in the first half, setting an All-Star record for points in a half. He finished one point shy of the All-Star game record set by Wilt Chamberlain (42) in 1962.

All-Star Weekend

Celebrity Game

Rising Stars Challenge

Shooting Stars Competition

a. Anthony Davis was replaced by Paul Millsap.
b. NBA Legends wore a current era jersey of the team best associated with the player, except for Dell Curry, a special exception because the old Charlotte Hornets relocated to New Orleans in 2002 and became the Pelicans in 2013.  Curry's official statistics belong to the Pelicans, but represented the new Charlotte Hornets, formerly known as the Charlotte Bobcats from 2004–2014, and wore their 2014 jersey in the contest.

Skills Challenge

b. John Wall was replaced by Patrick Beverley.
c. Michael Carter-Williams was replaced by Elfrid Payton.
d. Jimmy Butler was replaced by Dennis Schröder.

Three-Point Contest

Slam Dunk Contest

Rookie Zach LaVine won the Slam Dunk Contest to become the youngest champion (19) since an 18-year-old Kobe Bryant in 1997. He became a crowd favorite after his first dunk, which he performed while wearing Michael Jordan's No. 23 jersey from the movie Space Jam'', which inspired him as a youngster to become a basketball player. With a perfect 50 on each of his first two dunks, Lavine was the first player since Dwight Howard in 2009 with a perfect score on multiple dunks. Yahoo! Sports hailed him as "the most electrifying performer of All-Star Saturday Night ... and, if we're being honest, in quite a number of years."

References

External links

 2015 All-Star Game at NBA.com

National Basketball Association All-Star Game
NBA All-Star Game
Basketball competitions in New York City
Events in Brooklyn, New York
Sports in Manhattan
Sports in Brooklyn
All-Star Game
NBA All-Star Game
ABS-CBN television specials
2010s in Brooklyn
2010s in Manhattan
Prospect Heights, Brooklyn